The 2011–12 Saint Mary's Gaels men's basketball team represented Saint Mary's College of California in the 2011–12 college basketball season. This was head coach Randy Bennett's eleventh season at Saint Mary's. The Gaels compete in the West Coast Conference and played their home games at the McKeon Pavilion. They finished the season 27–6, 14–2 in WCC play to be crowned West Coast Conference regular season champions. They were also champions of the West Coast Basketball tournament to earn the conference's automatic bid to the 2012 NCAA tournament where they lost in the second round to Purdue.

Roster
Source

Schedule and results
Source
All times are Pacific

|-
!colspan=9| Regular season

|-
!colspan=9| West Coast Conference tournament

|-
!colspan=9| 2012 NCAA tournament

References

Saint Mary's
Saint Mary's Gaels men's basketball seasons
Saint Mary's